The IFBB Professional League Ms. Olympia (initially named the Miss Olympia) is professional bodybuilding's most prestigious competition and the title of the winner of the competition in female bodybuilding. The male professional bodybuilding equivalent of the Ms. Olympia is the Mr. Olympia. The natural professional female bodybuilding equivalent to the Ms. Olympia is the INBA/PNBA Natural Olympia. It was first held in 1980. It is held as part of the Joe Weider's Olympia Fitness & Performance Weekend from 2000 to 2014 and 2020 to the present.

History

1980 – 1989

In 1980, the first Ms. Olympia (initially known as the "Miss" Olympia) was held with Rachel McLish winning and becoming the first Ms. Olympia. Rachel was dethroned by Ritva Elomaa in 1981, but regained the title in 1982. George Snyder lost the rights to the Ms. Olympia in 1982, and after this the contestants were no longer hand-picked, but instead qualified for the Ms. Olympia through placings in lesser contests. As female bodybuilding grew and progressed, the competitors' level of training gradually increased, with most of the competitors in the earliest shows having very little weight training experience, and the sport slowly evolving towards more muscular physiques. This trend started to emerge in 1983, with McLish not competing in the big shows, Carla Dunlap won the 1983 Ms. Olympia. Dunlap possessed a much more muscular physique than previous Ms. Olympia winners McLish or Elomaa.

In 1984, Corinna Everson won the Ms. Olympia title in Montreal Canada, the first competition to be held outside the United States. Everson would go on to win six consecutive Ms. Olympia titles in a row before retiring in 1989 undefeated as a professional, the only woman ever to accomplish this.

1990 – 1999
Normally, competitors must qualify for the Ms. Olympia by achieving certain placings in lesser pro contests. However, the cancellation of the Women's Pro World contest in 1990 left only the Ms. International as a Ms. Olympia qualifier. Consequently, the IFBB decided to open the 1990 Ms. Olympia to all women with pro cards, and a field of thirty competitors entered. This was also the first Ms. Olympia without the incumbent Ms. Olympia champion defending her title. Lenda Murray earned a decisive victory by winning the first Ms. Olympia competition she attended in 1990 and emerging as the successor to Corinna Everson. The 1991 Ms. Olympia was the first to be televised live. Lenda Murray barely edged out Bev Francis, a former Australian powerlifter, by a single point that year. Lenda Murray faced a serious challenge from Denise Rutkowski in 1993, and some argue that Rutkowski, not Murray, should have won that year. Rutkowski shocked the Ms. Olympia contest entourage and fans by retiring in 1994, just as her career was gaining mainstream popularity and her potential for winning a Ms. Olympia title was high.

In the 1996 Ms. Olympia, six-time consecutive Ms. Olympia champion Lenda Murray was dethroned by Kim Chizevsky-Nicholls (then known as Kim Chizevsky). Chizevsky-Nicholls had previously placed 2nd in the 1995 Ms. Olympia, but her victory came as something of a surprise, since many had regarded Murray as virtually unbeatable. After being defeated by Chizevsky-Nicholls and placing second again in the 1997 Ms. Olympia, Murray retired from bodybuilding. Chizevsky-Nicholls went on to win the 1998 Ms. Olympia, held in Prague, Czech Republic, the second and most recent time the competition had been held outside the United States.

1992 Ms. Olympia changes
In response to the increased size displayed by Murray and Francis at the previous Ms. Olympia, the IFBB made an attempt to "feminize" the sport.  The IFBB, led by Ben Weider, had created a series of "femininity" rules—one line in the judging rules said that competitors should not be "too big".  The judges’ guide to the competitors stated that they were looking for a feminine, but not emaciated, physique. Advertising in Muscle & Fitness for the 1992 Ms. Olympia featured Anja Schreiner of Germany prominently, relegating two-time defending champion Murray to a small "also competing" notice.  Nevertheless, Murray apparently met the "femininity" requirements, and managed to retain her title; Schreiner finished 6th, and promptly retired from competition. After 1992, the judging rules were rewritten, with the new rules retaining provisions for aesthetics but allowing the contests to be judged as physique contests. Murray went on to win six consecutive Ms. Olympia titles from 1990 to 1995, matching Corinna Everson's record.  Produced by: American Sports Network and Nationally Televised on ESPN. Directed by: Keith Hobelman

1999 Ms. Olympia controversy and retirement 
In 1999, Ms. Olympia was originally scheduled to be held on October 9 in Santa Monica, California. However, one month before the scheduled date, the IFBB announced that the contest had been canceled. The main cause was the withdrawal of promoter Jarka Kastnerova (who promoted the 1998 contest in Prague) for financial reasons, including a low number of advance ticket sales for the 1999 event. The backlash following the announcement led to a flurry of activity, with the contest being rescheduled as part of the Women's Extravaganza (promoted by Kenny Kassel and Bob Bonham) in Secaucus, New Jersey on 2 October. Last minute sponsorship came from several sources, most significantly in the form of $50,000 from Flex magazine. Amid all the turmoil, Kim Chizevsky-Nicholls won her fourth consecutive Ms. Olympia title. Also notable about the 1999 Ms. Olympia was that this was the first Ms. Olympia Iris Kyle competed in.  However, after the 1999 Ms. Olympia, Kim Chizevsky-Nicholls retired from bodybuilding and began competing in fitness and figure competitions in 2001.

2000 – 2005 
The 2001 Ms. Olympia featured a "surprise" win from Juliette Bergmann who returned to competition after not competing since 1989. Entering the Olympia as a lightweight, she defeated heavyweight winner Iris Kyle for the overall title. In the five years that the Ms. Olympia was contested in multiple weight classes, this was the only time that the lightweight winner took the overall title.

After five-year absence, six-time Olympia winner Lenda Murray returned to the 2002 Ms. Olympia, with Bergmann won lightweight and Murray winning heavyweight and overall.  Murray went on to win both the heavyweight and overall in the 2002 and 2003 Ms. Olympia. Murray was for the second time in her career was dethroned of her Ms. Olympia title by Iris Kyle in 2004, who won the heavyweight and overall. After her 2004 Ms. Olympia defeat, Murray, retired from bodybuilding.

2000 Ms. Olympia changes 
The IFBB introduced several changes to Ms. Olympia in 2000. The first change was that Ms. Olympia contest would no longer be held as a separate contest, instead became part of the "Olympia Weekend" in Las Vegas and held the day before the men’s show. The second change was when heavyweight and lightweight classes were added. The third change was the new judging guidelines for presentations were introduced. A letter to the competitors from Jim Manion (chairman of the Professional Judges Committee) stated that women would be judged on healthy appearance, face, makeup, and skin tone. The criteria given in Manion's letter included the statement "symmetry, presentation, separations, and muscularity BUT NOT TO THE EXTREME!" The 2000 Ms. Olympia is the only Ms. Olympia with no overall winner, with Andrulla Blanchette winning lightweight class and Valentina Chepiga winning heavyweight class.

2005 Ms. Olympia changes 

On 6 December 2004, IFBB Professional Division Vice Chairman Jim Manion issued a memo introducing the so-called '20 percent rule' to all IFBB professional female athletes. It read, “For aesthetics and health reasons, the IFBB Professional Division requests that female athletes in Bodybuilding, Fitness and Figure decrease the amount of muscularity by a factor of 20%. This request for a 20% decrease in the amount of muscularity applies to those female athletes whose physiques require the decrease regardless of whether they compete in Bodybuilding, Fitness or Figure. All professional judges have been advised of the proper criteria for assessing female physiques.” Needless to say the directive created quite a stir, and left many women wondering if they were one of “those female athletes whose physiques require the decrease”. On 26 April 2005, IFBB Professional Committee adopted, by a vote of 9 for, 1 against and 3 no votes, Resolution 2005-001, which removed weight classes to allow for one category only of competition in women’s professional bodybuilding and that it would take effect at the 2005 Ms. Olympia.

According to Bill Dobbins, reports he heard that the moving the Ms. Olympia from Friday night to Saturday in the Las Vegas Convention Center for free and as part of the Expo was an attempt to improve pay-per-view sales and removing weight divisions was based on the perception that the men and women bodybuilders should operate according to the same rules. He also stated that both decisions were led by A360 Media, LLC and Benjamin and Joseph Weider.

At the 2005 Ms. Olympia, Yaxeni Oriquen-Garcia dethroned Iris Kyle. Olympia she wanted to lead by example. At the 2005 Ms. Iris commented that it looked like Yaxeni had did the opposite of IFBB ADVISORY NOTICE 2004-006 and won because of it.

According to Bill Dobbins, he commented that Iris might have been slightly off from 2004 and looked a little too depleted or dehydrated compared to how she looked in previous Ms. Olympias, while Yaxeni looked the best he had ever seen of her, but that the differences was very small. He also commented in the report that prior to the 2005 Ms. Olympia there was speculation about how the judging would be conducted, which centered on the idea that the IFBB didn't Iris Kyle not win another Ms. Olympia title. He also stated that the decision wasn't primarily political and the Olympia audience wasn’t outraged by the decision.

2006 – 2014 
At the 2006 Ms. Olympia, Iris Kyle, coming off beating the defending Ms. International champion Yaxeni Oriquen-Garcia, reclaimed the Ms. Olympia title from defending Ms. Olympia champion Yaxeni, who showed a dramatic drop in form and slipped to 7th place. Yaxeni, who continue to compete at the Ms. Olympia competitions from 2007 to 2014 and 2020, would never again regain the Ms. Olympia title, but would remain in the top six of every Ms. Olympia from 2007 to 2014.

From 2007 to 2014, Iris went on to win the next 8 overall Ms. Olympia titles and winning 9 consecutive overall Ms. Olympia titles in a row. At the 2012 Ms. Olympia, she won her 8th overall Ms. Olympia title, tying with Lenda Murray's record of 8 overall and 2 heavyweight Ms. Olympia titles. At the 2013 Ms. Olympia, Iris won her 9th overall Ms. Olympia title, beating Lenda Murray's record, which meant she won more Olympia titles than any other professional bodybuilder, female or male.

At the 2014 Ms. Olympia, Iris solidified her record by winning her 10th overall Ms. Olympia title. This was her 9th consecutive overall Ms. Olympia titles in a row, beating both Lee Haney's and Ronnie Coleman's record of 8 consecutive overall Olympia titles in a row, which meant she won more consecutive overall Olympia titles in a row than any other professional bodybuilder, female or male. She announced her retirement right after winning the title at the 2014 Ms. Olympia. In 2014, International Federation of BodyBuilding and Fitness announced that Ms. Olympia had been cancelled for 2015, with no explicit reason stated.

2019 
After 5 years of being discontinued, on 14 September 2019, emcee Bob Chicherillo announced at the Joe Weider's Olympia Fitness & Performance Weekend 2019 that the Ms. Olympia would return to the Joe Weider's Olympia Fitness & Performance Weekend 2020.

2020 – present 

On 14 February 2020, A360 Media, LLC sold Joe Weider’s Olympia Fitness & Performance Weekend to Jake Wood. Due to the COVID-19 pandemic, the Joe Weider’s Olympia Fitness & Performance Weekend was postponed to December 2020 and moved to the Orange County Convention Center in Orlando, Florida due to the limits the attendees in Nevada. In Nevada, due to covid restrictions, just 250 people could be in attendance, while in Florida, 2,500 people could be in attendance. Later in 2020, Andrea Shaw, a dark horse competitor coming off her previous 2020 wins at the Omaha Pro and Rising Phoenix World Championships, defeated Helle Trevino and Margaret Martin, both of whom were former Ms Rising Phoenix title holders and obtained the Ms. Olympia title. She would repeat her double wins at the Rising Phoenix World Championships and Ms. Olympia in 2021 and 2022. In 2021, the Joe Weider’s Olympia Fitness & Performance Weekend remained in Orlando. In 2022, the Joe Weider’s Olympia Fitness & Performance Weekend moved back to Las Vegas. In 2023, the Joe Weider’s Olympia Fitness & Performance Weekend moved back to Orlando.

Champions

Chronologically

Number of wins

Number of consecutive wins

Top 3

Medals by nation

See also
 Rising Phoenix World Championships (the equivalent competition to the Ms. Olympia from 2015 – 2019)
 Mr. Olympia (the male equivalent)

References

External links 
 Ms. Olympia Main Website

 
Female professional bodybuilding competitions
Olympia Weekend
Professional bodybuilding competitions
Recurring sporting events established in 1980
Recurring sporting events established in 2019
Recurring sporting events disestablished in 2014